New Franklin is a city in Howard County, Missouri, United States. The population was 1,027 at the 2020 census. It is part of the Columbia, Missouri Metropolitan Statistical Area.

History
Franklin was laid out in 1816. Due to the town's frequent flooding, Franklin was relocated up the hill in 1826, giving rise to the community of New Franklin. Franklin's name is taken from the name of Benjamin Franklin.

The Harris-Chilton-Ruble House, Thomas Hickman House, New Franklin Commercial Historic District, and Rivercene are listed on the National Register of Historic Places.

Geography
New Franklin is located at  (39.016071, -92.738308).

Demographics

2010 census
As of the census of 2010, there were 1,089 people, 496 households, and 292 families residing in the city. The racial makeup of the city was 94.3% White, 1.6% African American, 1.3% Native American, 0.1% Asian, 0.1% Pacific Islander, 0.5% from other races, and 2.2% from two or more races. Hispanic or Latino of any race were 1.3% of the population.

There were 496 households, of which 28.8% had children under the age of 18 living with them, 44.8% were married couples living together, 8.9% had a female householder with no husband present, 5.2% had a male householder with no wife present, and 41.1% were non-families. 37.1% of all households were made up of individuals, and 18.7% had someone living alone who was 65 years of age or older. The average household size was 2.20 and the average family size was 2.86.

The median age in the city was 41.6 years. 21.6% of residents were under the age of 18; 6.9% were between the ages of 18 and 24; 25.8% were from 25 to 44; 24.7% were from 45 to 64; and 20.9% were 65 years of age or older. The gender makeup of the city was 47.0% male and 53.0% female.

2000 census
As of the census of 2000, there were 1,147 people, 483 households, and 310 families residing in the city. The population density was 858.6 people per square mile (332.4/km). There were 517 housing units at an average density of 387.7 per square mile (150.1/km). The racial makeup of the city was 96.68% White, 0.96% African American, 0.09% Native American, 0.35% Pacific Islander, 0.79% from other races, and 1.14% from two or more races. Hispanic or Latino of any race were 2.10% of the population.

There were 483 households, out of which 32.1% had children under the age of 18 living with them, 50.3% were married couples living together, 10.1% had a female householder with no husband present, and 35.8% were non-families. 32.7% of all households were made up of individuals, and 21.1% had someone living alone who was 65 years of age or older. The average household size was 2.32 and the average family size was 2.91.

In the city the population was spread out, with 25.5% under the age of 18, 5.5% from 18 to 24, 27.6% from 25 to 44, 20.1% from 45 to 64, and 21.3% who were 65 years of age or older. The median age was 38 years. For every 100 females, there were 82.6 males. For every 100 females age 18 and over, there were 83.0 males.

The median income for a household in the city was $30,757, and the median income for a family was $36,875. Males had a median income of $25,982 versus $18,919 for females. The per capita income for the city was $12,657. About 8.7% of families and 13.7% of the population were below the poverty line, including 15.0% of those under age 18 and 21.1% of those age 65 or over.

Notable people
 Kit Carson, explorer, guide, frontiersman
 Sara Evans, country music singer

Notable place
New Franklin is home to the University of Missouri Center for Agroforestry, which holds an annual chestnut roast in the area.

References

External links
 New Franklin, Missouri website
 Santa Fe Trail Research
 Historic maps of New Franklin in the Sanborn Maps of Missouri Collection at the University of Missouri

Cities in Howard County, Missouri
Columbia metropolitan area (Missouri)
Cities in Missouri